In Riemann surface theory and hyperbolic geometry, the Macbeath surface, also called Macbeath's curve or the Fricke–Macbeath curve, is the genus-7 Hurwitz surface.

The automorphism group of the Macbeath surface is the simple group PSL(2,8), consisting of 504 symmetries.

Triangle group construction

The surface's Fuchsian group can be constructed as the principal congruence subgroup of the (2,3,7) triangle group in a suitable tower of principal congruence subgroups.  Here the choices of quaternion algebra and Hurwitz quaternion order are described at the triangle group page.  Choosing the ideal  in the ring of integers, the corresponding principal congruence subgroup defines this surface of genus 7.  Its systole is about 5.796, and the number of systolic loops is 126 according to R. Vogeler's calculations.

It is possible to realize the resulting triangulated surface as a non-convex polyhedron without self-intersections.

Historical note

Elkies writes that the equivalence between the curves studied by Fricke and Macbeath "may first have been observed by Serre in a 24.vii.1990 letter to Abhyankar".

See also
 Klein quartic
 First Hurwitz triplet

Notes

References

.
.
.
.
.
. Translation in Moscow Univ. Math. Bull. 44 (1989), no. 5, 37–40.
.
.
. Corrigendum, vol. 28, no. 2, 1986, p. 241, .

Hyperbolic geometry
Riemann surfaces
Riemannian geometry
Differential geometry of surfaces
Systolic geometry